A total lunar eclipse took place on Wednesday, October 18, 1967, the second of two total lunar eclipses in 1967, the first being on April 24, 1967.

Visibility
It was completely visible over Asia, Australia, Pacific Ocean, North America, South America, and Arctic, seen rising over Asia and Australia and setting over North America and South America.

Related lunar eclipses

Lunar year series

Saros series

Metonic series
This eclipse is the third of four Metonic cycle lunar eclipses on the same date, April 23–24, each separated by 19 years:

Tritos series

Half-Saros cycle
A lunar eclipse will be preceded and followed by solar eclipses by 9 years and 5.5 days (a half saros). This lunar eclipse is related to two total solar eclipses of Solar Saros 133.

Tzolkinex 
 Preceded: Lunar eclipse of September 5, 1960

 Followed: Lunar eclipse of November 29, 1974

See also
List of lunar eclipses
List of 20th-century lunar eclipses

Notes

External links

1967-10
1967 in science
October 1967 events